Bélarga (Languedocien: Belargan) is a commune in the Hérault département in the Occitanie region in southern France.

Geography

Population

Sites and monuments
 Château de Bélarga

See also
Communes of the Hérault department

References

Communes of Hérault